Senjedak or Senjedk may refer to:
 Senjedak, Markazi
 Senjedak, Fariman, Razavi Khorasan Province
 Senjedak, Kashmar, Razavi Khorasan Province
 Senjedak, Sistan and Baluchestan
 Senjedak, Behabad, Yazd Province

See also
Senjetak (disambiguation)